Holy Redeemer Junior Senior Catholic High School (HRH) is a Catholic  high school located in Edson, Alberta, Canada.

References

External links
Board Office

Edson, Alberta
High schools in Alberta
Catholic secondary schools in Alberta
Educational institutions established in 2003
2003 establishments in Alberta